Song to the King is the first full-length studio album from Christian band Pocket Full of Rocks. It was released on March 14, 2006 by Myrrh Records.

Track listing

All songs written by Michael Farren.
 "The Welcome Song" - 5:09
 "Closer to You" - 4:37
 "Worth Everything" - 4:36
 "Song to the King" - 4:57
 "Now I Sing" - 3:50
 "Bigger" - 3:30
 "Falling" - 6:31
 "Let the Worshippers Arise" - 4:33
 "This Is the Life" - 4:04
 "More of You Jesus" - 4:53
 "Losing Me" - 4:47
 "Let It Rain" - 11:33
 [Untitled Track] - 3:53

Reception

Chart performance

The album peaked at #44 on Billboard's Christian Albums.

Awards

The album received a nomination at the 38th GMA Dove Awards for Praise & Worship Album of the Year. The band was also nominated for New Artist of the Year.

References

External links
Song to the King on Amazon.com

2006 albums